Fuell is a surname. Notable people with the surname include:

Donald Fuell (born 1938), American football player
John Fuell (by 1523–73/75), English Member of Parliament

See also
Buell (surname)
Fell (surname)